WWTP may also refer to:

 Wastewater Treatment Plant, a plant to treat wastewater to get clean water
 WWTP (FM), a radio station in Augusta, Maine